The Assignment is a 1997 spy action thriller film directed by Christian Duguay and starring Aidan Quinn (in two roles), with Donald Sutherland and Ben Kingsley. The film, written by Dan Gordon and Sabi H. Shabtai, is set mostly in the late 1980s and deals with a CIA plan to use Quinn's character to masquerade as the Venezuelan terrorist Carlos the Jackal.

Plot
Carlos the Jackal has sex and kills a spider in its web with his cigarette then evicts the woman from his room. He dons a disguise and walks to a cafe where CIA agent Henry Fields (Donald Sutherland) is sitting at a table. He recognizes Fields and asks for a light but Fields does not recognize Carlos, because of his disguise.  He watches as Carlos detonates a grenade, killing dozens of people.

The next year, the Jackal attacks an OPEC meeting to earn a ransom.  The CIA sends Fields to identify Carlos, but he secretly plans to assassinate him with a concealed pistol.  The plan is foiled when his CIA superior stops him from reaching out to shake Carlos' hand because he might be photographed doing so by nearby journalists.

In 1986 Carlos is apparently apprehended in an open-air market in Jerusalem and brutally interrogated by a Mossad commander named Amos (Ben Kingsley). The man claims to actually be a US Naval officer named Annibal Ramirez (Aidan Quinn) whose identification was lost in the chaos of his arrest. Amos confirms his identity and lets him go, stunned that Ramirez looks exactly like Carlos. Back at home, Ramirez is visited by Fields (now using the name Jack Shaw) who tries to recruit him to impersonate the terrorist leader. Ramirez refuses the assignment.

Shaw persists, turning up at a Navy ball and trying various manipulations to goad Ramirez into taking the assignment.  He finally succeeds by confronting Ramirez with the human cost of Carlos' terrorism by taking him to Bethesda Naval Hospital to see a boy who has been crippled by one of Carlos' bombs.

Amos and Shaw train Ramirez at a former prison in Canada. Much of his training is devoted to situational awareness and internalizing details of Carlos' life. His training concludes with Carla, one of Carlos' ex-mistresses, training Ramirez in how to make love like Carlos. The plan revolves around convincing the KGB, which is financing his terrorism, that Carlos has begun selling information to the CIA. Shaw lures one of Carlos' ex-lovers, Agnieska, to Libya, where Ramirez convinces her of his legitimacy. He notices she has become an informant for French intelligence, however. Several French agents arrive at their apartment, and Ramirez is forced to kill them to his own horror.

Carlos sends an assassin to kill Agnieska in France, ordering him to leave Europe through London. The assassin happens to be in Heathrow airport at the same time as Ramirez, and he quickly realizes he is an impostor after Ramirez fails to recognize a code phrase. During a struggle, Amos and the assassin kill each other. After Amos' death, the CIA suspends the operation and Ramirez returns home.

Ramirez makes love to his wife as Carlos would, and she is disturbed by his change. The next day, at his son's little league game, he gets into a confrontation with another father and nearly kills him. Shaw bails him out of jail, and both men are clearly suffering from the failure of their mission.  Ramirez accuses Shaw of fabricating the scene at the hospital to trick him into accepting the assignment and Shaw threatens to use the Ramirez family as bait to lure out Carlos if he tries to back out.  That night Ramirez painfully reveals the mission to his wife but leaves to continue it, knowing that his family will never be safe as long as Carlos is alive.

Ramirez and Shaw meet up in East Berlin and the KGB photographs them, assuming Carlos has been turned. Enraged, the KGB raids Carlos' safe house, but he escapes. Shaw and Ramirez are waiting outside for him, and Ramirez fights Carlos on the bank of the Spree River. It is impossible to tell which of the two is the real Carlos during the struggle. As one of the men is being held under water by the other, Shaw comes upon them and shoots the man above the water several times. He realizes too late that he has shot Ramirez, and Carlos swims away. Ramirez presses Shaw to leave him and kill Carlos, but Shaw insists that their plan has worked and that Carlos is a target of the KGB.

Back home, a car bomb appears to kill Ramirez and his family and Shaw attends the funeral.  In St. Martin, Ramirez receives a news clipping of the bombing with a congratulatory note from Shaw, implying that he staged the killing to liberate the Ramirez family.  Ramirez nearly kills a spider in its web like Carlos, but does not. Text reveals Carlos' true fate - arrested in 1994.

Cast

Reception
Rotten Tomatoes gives The Assignment a rating of 62% from 21 reviews.

See also
The Jackal (1997 film)

References

External links

1997 films
1990s spy thriller films
1997 action thriller films
American action thriller films
American spy thriller films
Canadian action thriller films
1990s English-language films
Films set in Montreal
Cold War films
Films about terrorism in Africa
Political thriller films
Triumph Films films
Films directed by Christian Duguay (director)
Films scored by Normand Corbeil
Films set in the 1980s
Films set in Libya
Films set in Austria
Films set in France
Films set in Israel
Cultural depictions of Carlos the Jackal
1990s American films
1990s Canadian films